Federal Highway 307 (Fed. 307) is a free part of the federal highway corridors of Mexico.  It consists of two discontinuous portions. One in the state of Quintana Roo, inland from the Caribbean coast,  running from Cancún in the north to near Chetumal in the south.   The other section of 307 is in the state of Chiapas, one end at Palenque, then going south east looping around the Reserva de la Biósfera Montes Azules, paralleling the Guatemalan border, then coming back west to La Trinitaria, Chiapas.

References

307
Transportation in Chiapas
Transportation in Quintana Roo
Cancún
Chetumal
Palenque
Solidaridad (municipality)
Tulum (municipality)